The flag of the Karelo-Finnish SSR was adopted by the Karelo-Finnish SSR on 3 March 1953. This flag is similar to the flag of the Soviet Union but with the blue (1/6 width), and green (1/5 width) placed on the bottom. At the top of the flag at the flagpole placed golden hammer and sickle and the red star with a gold border. The green color symbolizes the forest resources, and blue represents the abundance of rivers and lakes.

History
Prior to this, the flag was red with a gold hammer and sickle in the top-left corner, and the Latin characters Karjalais-Suomalainen SNT (Karjalais-Suomalainen Sosialistinen Neuvostotasavalta) with Карело-Финская ССР (Карело-Финская Советская Социалистическая Республика) below them in gold in a sans-serif font.

A 1947 proposal featured exactly the same design as the flag adopted in 1953 except with the abbreviations K.-S.S.N.T. and К.-Ф.С.С.Р. in gold in a sans-serif font below the gold hammer and sickle. The proposal also featured a line of black stylized trees on the blue line which would have made it stand out among SSR flags.

When the Karelo-Finnish SSR was demoted to ASSR status on 16 July 1956, the flag of the Russian SFSR was used but it has the words Карельская АССР ("Karel'skaya ASSR") and Karjalan ASNT were written below the hammer and sickle.

See also
 Flag of the Republic of Karelia

References

External links

Karelo-Finnish Soviet Socialist Republic
Karelo-Finnish Soviet Socialist Republic
Republic of Karelia
1953 establishments in Russia